Otso Räisänen (born 1 October 1994) is a Finnish freestyle skier. He was born in Helsinki. He competed at the 2014 Winter Olympics in Sochi, in slopestyle.

References 

1994 births
Living people
Sportspeople from Helsinki
Freestyle skiers at the 2014 Winter Olympics
Finnish male freestyle skiers
Olympic freestyle skiers of Finland